Stanine (STAndard NINE) is a method of scaling test scores on a nine-point standard scale with a mean of five and a standard deviation of two.

Some web sources attribute stanines to the U.S. Army Air Forces during World War II. Psychometric legend has it that a 1–9 scale was used because of the compactness of recording the score as a single digit but Thorndike  claims that by reducing scores to just nine values, stanines "reduce the tendency to try to interpret small score differences (p. 131)". The earliest known use of stanines was by the U.S. Army Air Forces in 1943.

Calculation
Test scores are scaled to stanine scores using the following algorithm:
 Rank results from lowest to highest
 Give the lowest 4% a stanine of 1, the next 7% a stanine of 2, etc., according to the following table:

The underlying basis for obtaining stanines is that a normal distribution is divided into nine intervals, each of which has a width of 0.5 standard deviations excluding the first and last, which are just the remainder (the tails of the distribution). The mean lies at the centre of the fifth interval.

Use today
Today stanines are mostly used in educational assessment. 
 The University of Alberta in Edmonton, Alberta, Canada used the stanine system until 2003, when it switched to a 4-point scale.  
 In the United States, the Educational Records Bureau (they administer the "ERBs") reports test scores as stanines and percentiles.
 The New Zealand Council for Educational Research uses stanines.
 GL Assessment use stanines alongside SAS (Standardised Age Scores) to express the results of its CAT4 assessments, used in many UK and British international schools 
 The Otis-Lennon School Ability Test uses a stanine system along with percentiles.
 Average Korean High School uses stanine system to evaluate their students
 The IDF (Israeli Defense Force) uses the stanine grading system ranging from 10 to 90 (10,20,30 and so on) to rank intelligence ability relevant to the army's use, determined by a 100 question test divided to 4 categories having to do with different uses and implications of cognitive abilities

See also
 Sten scores – a similar system, but with 10 possible values
 Normal score

Notes

References
 Ballew, Pat Origins of some arithmetic terms-2 . Retrieved Dec. 26, 2004.
 Boydsten, Robert E. (February 27, 2000), Winning My Wings

Volume Six 
MEN AND PLANES 
THE ARMY AIR FORCES 
In World War II 
PREPARED UNDER THE EDITORSHIP OF 
WESLEY FRANK CRAVEN 
JAMES LEA GATE 
Princeton University 
University of Chicago

Here is a link to the document:
http://www.afhso.af.mil/shared/media/document/AFD-101105-019.pdf 

Educational assessment and evaluation
Scales
Comparison of assessments
Psychometrics